The Shree Geeta Bhawan Mandir is the first Hindu temple in the Midlands of England, opened in a former church in 1969. It is situated at 107-117 Heathfield Road, on the corner of Brecon Road, on the border of the Handsworth and Lozells districts of Birmingham.

Originally, services were held at 32 Hall Road, Birmingham B20 2BQ.

The Mandir has a daily Aarti at 11 am and 7 pm and has weekly Poojas for Balaji on Sunday mornings, and Durga Maa on Tuesday evenings.

Architecture 

The building was the former St George's Presbyterian Church and was originally designed by J.P.Osborne in a cruciform shape in 1896.

Pevsner and Wedgwood (1966) said it was "...in a style variously described as 'modern Gothic' and a 'modification of Renaissance'. In fact an ungainly mixture of styles and an odd plan.".

References

External links

 

Hindu temples in England
Religious buildings and structures in Birmingham, West Midlands